is a Japanese manga series written and illustrated by Akiko Higashimura. It is the story of Uesugi Kenshin, and tackles a theory that the historical figure was a woman. It was serialized in Shogakukan's seinen manga magazine Hibana  from March 2015 to August 2017, when the manga ceased its publication, and it was then serialized in Weekly Big Comic Spirits from January 2018 to October 2020. Its chapters were collected in ten tankōbon volumes.

Publication
Yukibana no Tora, written and illustrated by Akiko Higashimura, tells the story of Uesugi Kenshin, and tackles a theory that the historical figure was a woman. The manga was serialized Shogakukan's seinen manga magazine Hibana  from March 6, 2015, to August 7, 2017, when the magazine ceased its publication. Originally, it was planned that the manga would be transferred to Monthly Big Comic Spirits, however, it was later reported that it would be moved to Weekly Big Comic Spirits, starting on January 15, 2018. The series finished on October 26, 2020. Shogakukan collected its chapters into ten individual tankōbon volumes, released from September 11, 2015, to February 12, 2021.

The manga is licensed in France by Le Lézard noir.

Volume list

Reception
Yukibana no Tora ranked #14 on the "Nationwide Bookstore Employees' Recommended Comics" by the Honya Club website in 2016. In November 2019, the manga was nominated at the 47th Angoulême International Comics Festival for the Best Young Adult Comic Award.

References

External links
 

Historical anime and manga
Seinen manga
Shogakukan manga